McClarem Lake is a natural lake in South Dakota, in the United States.

McClarem Lake has the name of Charles and William McClarem, pioneers who settled there.

See also
List of lakes in South Dakota

References

Lakes of South Dakota
Bodies of water of Campbell County, South Dakota